Luca Filippo Ravenna (Milano, 27 September 1987) is an Italian comedian and television author.

Career 
Born in Milan, he trained at the Experimental Cinematography Center in Rome; among the first experiences he collaborated with the Roman comedy group The Pills in some comic sketches published on YouTube and on television as well as co-author of their first feature film The Pills - Sempre meglio che lavorare. His career undergoes a substantial change when he attends a show by the comedian Edoardo Ferrario, so from 2014 he decides to devote himself to stand-up comic performances of which he himself is the only author. In 2018 he toured his first comedy show "In the ghetto" with dates in major Italian and European cities.

Parallel to his activity as a comedian, he often plays that of television author who in the past have seen him involved in numerous television programs such as Quelli che.. il calcio and Che fuori tempo che fa hosted by Fabio Fazio. In 2015 he is the protagonist and author of the web series No Problem, produced for Repubblica.it. He has participated in the television programs Natural born comedians and Stand up comedy, both on Comedy Central.

In 2020 his first show Luca Ravenna Live @ is released online, produced by Dazzle in collaboration with Aguilar and Indigo Film. Also in the same year he performs with the new live comedy show Rodrigo Live. Together with Edoardo Ferrario he leads the podcast Cachemire - Un podcast morbidissimo. Each episode of the program deals with a topic that varies from episode to episode. The first guest on the podcast was Walter Veltroni during episode 8.

In March 2021 he publishes the totally improvised comedy show "Luca Ravenna: Improv Special vol. 1" via The Comedy Club platform. In April 2021 he participates as a contestant in the Amazon Prime Video comedy show LOL - Chi ride è fuori.

Comic shows 

 ''In the Ghetto'' (2018)
 ''Luca Ravenna Live@'' (2020)
 ''Rodrigo Live'' (2020)
 ''Luca Ravenna: Improv Special vol.1'' (2021)

Television 

 Quelli che... il Calcio (Rai 2) (2016, 2017)
 The Pills: non ce la faremo mai (Italia 1) (2015)
 Natural Born Comedians (Comedy Central) (2015, 2016)
 Stand up comedy (Comedy Central) (2017, 2018)
 Zio Gianni (Rai 2) (2015–2016)
 Che fuori tempo che fa (Rai 1) (2017)
 LOL - Chi ride è fuori (Amazon Prime Video) (2021)

Web 

 Non c'è problema (Repubblica.it, 2015)
 Cachemire – Un podcast morbidissimo (YouTube, 2020 – in progress)
 LOL - Chi ride è fuori (Amazon Prime Video, 2021)

Filmography

As author 

 The Pills - Sempre meglio che lavorare (2016)

References 

Italian comedians
Living people
1987 births